Ance is a village in Ventspils municipality, Latvia.

See also
Ance parish

References

Towns and villages in Latvia
Ventspils Municipality